Brett Gregory Hayes (born February 13, 1984) is an American former professional baseball catcher and current bullpen coach for the Texas Rangers of Major League Baseball (MLB). He played in MLB for the Florida/Miami Marlins, Kansas City Royals, and Cleveland Indians.

Personal life
Brett Hayes is the son of Tim Hayes Jr., and the grandson of Tim Hayes Sr., both professional baseball players. Tim Hayes Jr. was drafted by the Kansas City Royals, but never appeared professionally. Tim Hayes Sr. played professionally for the Cleveland Indians. In the fall of 2011, Brett married longtime girlfriend Elizabeth, in Minnesota.

Hayes attended Notre Dame High School in Sherman Oaks and was a two-year varsity starter.

College
Hayes attended college at the University of Nevada, Reno. While playing for the Nevada Wolf Pack, he was named the Western Athletic Conference Freshman of the Year, and a Freshman All-American. He made the all-Western Athletic Conference team for three straight seasons. In 2004, he played collegiate summer baseball with the Cotuit Kettleers of the Cape Cod Baseball League.

Minor League
Hayes played 51 games in 2007, splitting time between Jupiter and Carolina. From 2008 to 2011, Hayes played for Jupiter, Carolina, New Orleans, and Albuquerque.

Major Leagues

Florida Marlins
Hayes was called up to the Florida Marlins on May 22, 2009, hitting a single in his first at bat that night. He hit his first major league home run off of the Washington Nationals' Víctor Gárate on September 5, 2009.

After splitting the 2010 season in the major and minor leagues, Hayes played in 64 games for the Marlins in 2011, batting .231 with 5 home runs and 16 runs batted in.

To open 2012, Hayes was the backup catcher behind John Buck. After playing in 39 games for the Marlins, he was sent down to Triple-A New Orleans on August 12, 2012. In those 39 games, Hayes batted .202 with three runs batted in, no home runs, and six runs scored.

Kansas City Royals
The Kansas City Royals claimed Hayes off waivers on November 2, 2012. He signed a one-year, $600,000 contract with the Royals on November 20, 2012. His contract was selected from the Omaha Storm Chasers on August 4 when Salvador Pérez was placed on the 7-day disabled list. He was designated for assignment on August 11, 2013 when Perez returned. He was outrighted to Omaha on August 15. His contract was selected again when the major league rosters expanded on September 1. Hayes was designated for assignment by the Royals on July 28, 2014.

Cleveland Indians
On December 15, 2014, he signed a minor league contract with the Cleveland Indians. The Indians purchased his contract on April 14, 2015 and added him to the active roster. Hayes was designated for assignment on May 24.

Arizona Diamondbacks
For the 2016 season, Hayes began the season with the Reno Aces, the Diamondbacks AAA affiliate.

Chicago White Sox
On June 6, 2016, Hayes was traded to Chicago for cash considerations.

Texas Rangers
Hayes signed a minor league contract with the Texas Rangers on February 10, 2017. He elected free agency on November 6, 2017.

Front office and coaching roles
After retiring from playing following the 2017 season, Hayes joined the Texas Rangers Front Office, serving as an advance scout in 2018. Hayes was promoted to Coordinator of Run Prevention for the 2019 season, joining the Rangers coaching staff. His role included traveling with the team and preparing advanced scouting reports in conjunction with the Rangers pitching coaches. On January 6, 2022, Hayes was promoted to bullpen coach of the Rangers.

References

External links

1984 births
Living people
Albuquerque Isotopes players
Baseball players from Pasadena, California
Carolina Mudcats players
Charlotte Knights players
Cleveland Indians players
Columbus Clippers players
Cotuit Kettleers players
Florida Marlins players
Greensboro Grasshoppers players
Gulf Coast Marlins players
Jamestown Jammers players
Jupiter Hammerheads players
Kansas City Royals players
Major League Baseball bullpen coaches
Major League Baseball catchers
Miami Marlins players
Nevada Wolf Pack baseball players
New Orleans Zephyrs players
Notre Dame High School (Sherman Oaks, California) alumni
Omaha Storm Chasers players
Peoria Saguaros players
Reno Aces players
Round Rock Express players
Sportspeople from Pasadena, California
Texas Rangers coaches
Texas Rangers scouts